Merrily We Roll Along is a forthcoming American coming-of-age musical comedy film written and directed by Richard Linklater based on the 1981 stage musical of the same name by Stephen Sondheim and George Furth, which is in turn adapted from the 1934 play of the same name by George S. Kaufman and Moss Hart. Jason Blum serves as a producer under his Blumhouse Productions banner. The film began principal photography in 2019 for an anticipated release in approximately 2039.

Premise
Talented Broadway composer Franklin Shepard abandons his friends and career to become a Hollywood producer, told over the course of 20 years in reverse chronological order.

Cast
 Paul Mescal as Franklin Shepard
 Beanie Feldstein as Mary Flynn
 Ben Platt as Charley Kringas

Production
On August 29, 2019, Blumhouse Productions acquired the rights to make a Merrily We Roll Along film, with Richard Linklater directing the film and producing along with Ginger Sledge, Jason Blum, and Jonathan Marc Sherman. Ben Platt, Beanie Feldstein and Blake Jenner were cast to star in the film. Production on the film was announced to commence every couple of years to reflect the characters age over 20 years, similar to how Boyhood (also written and directed by Linklater) was shot over 12 years. The film is based on the latest version of Furth's book, which was adapted by Linklater into the film's screenplay.

Jenner exited the film in 2019 (following the filming of the "Our Time" sequence) following allegations of domestic abuse made by his ex-wife Melissa Benoist. Paul Mescal took over the role of Franklin Shepard proceeding forward, and the sequence was reshot.

References

External links
 

American films based on plays
American musical comedy films
American nonlinear narrative films
Blumhouse Productions films
Upcoming English-language films
Films about Hollywood, Los Angeles
Films about mass media people
Films set in Los Angeles
Films set in New York City
Films set in 1976
Films set in 1975
Films set in 1974
Films set in 1973
Films set in 1972
Films set in 1971
Films set in 1970
Films set in 1969
Films set in 1968
Films set in 1967
Films set in 1966
Films set in 1965
Films set in 1964
Films set in 1963
Films set in 1962
Films set in 1961
Films set in 1960
Films set in 1959
Films set in 1958
Films set in 1957
Films based on musicals
Films based on works by Stephen Sondheim
Films directed by Richard Linklater
Films produced by Jason Blum
Upcoming films